Baden Cooke (born 12 October 1978) is an Australian retired professional racing cyclist, who competed professionally between 2000 and 2013.

Early life
Born in Benalla, Victoria, Cooke began competitive cycling at 11. He completed secondary school at Galen College in Wangaratta, Victoria, and was an Australian Institute of Sport scholarship holder.

Career
His professional career began with the Mercury team in 2000, though he found racing in Europe to be more challenging than initially expected. Nevertheless, he adapted. He was more successful during that debut season in Australia and America, where he won stages of the Herald Sun Tour and the Sea Otter Classic, respectively. Having moved to the French team Française des Jeux in 2002, Cooke competed in the Commonwealth Games that year, finishing third behind fellow Australians Stuart O'Grady and Cadel Evans. He also participated in the Tour de France in 2002, 2003, 2004, 2005, 2008 and 2012. In 2003 he won the Green jersey which is the Points classification in the Tour de France by two points in a tight finish on Stage 20 on the Champs-Élysées with fellow Australian sprinter Robbie McEwen second and O'Grady seventh in the final points classification. In 2004 Cooke came 12th in the points classification.

Cooke represented Australia in the road race at the 2004 Summer Olympics along with McEwen, Michael Rogers, O'Grady and Matt White.

Cooke raced 2006 and 2007 for Unibet.com. He joined Barloworld for 2008 but in 2009 moved to Dutch cycling team Vacansoleil. Cooke announced on his website that he would ride for Team Saxo Bank in 2010 – he continued with that team in 2011, before moving to the new  team for the 2012 season. After the 2013 season, Cooke retired.

After retiring, Cooke announced that he was moving into rider management. In January 2014 he became the agent of former team-mate and winner of the 2013 Vuelta a España Chris Horner. He subsequently also became agent for Michael Matthews, Gert Steegmans and Janez Brajkovič.

He recently purchased a stake in Factor bikes and Black Inc wheels.

Television appearances
In 2021, Cooke competed on Australian Survivor: Brains V Brawn.

Career highlights

Major results

1996
 1st  National Junior Points Race Championships
 1st Bendigo Tour
 1st Criterium Bike SA Race
2000
 1st  National Madison Championships
 1st Prix de Bles d'Or
 Rapport Tour
1st Points classification
1st Stage 7
 Herald Sun Tour
1st Stages 2, 5 & 9
1st Criterium competition
2001
 Tour de l'Avenir
1st Points classification
1st Stages 6 & 10
 1st Stage 4 Sea Otter Classic
2002
 1st  Overall Herald Sun Tour
1st Stages 2 & 4
 1st  Overall Paris–Corrèze
1st Stages 1
 1st Dwars door Vlaanderen
 1st Tro-Bro Léon
 1st Stage 1 GP du Midi Libre
 1st Stage 8 Circuit des Mines
 3rd  Road race, Commonwealth Games
 3rd GP Ouest France-Plouay
 5th Paris–Brussels
 9th Road race, UCI Road World Championships
2003
 1st Kampioenschap van Vlaanderen
 1st Grand Prix de Fourmies
 Tour de France
1st  Points classification
1st Stage 2
 Tour Down Under
1st Stages 1 & 4
 1st Stage 9 Tour de Suisse
 1st Stage 3 Tour Méditerranéen
 2nd Dwars door Vlaanderen
 4th Paris–Tours
 7th Paris–Bourges
2004
 1st  Overall Bay Classic Series
 1st Grand Prix d'Ouverture La Marseillaise
 Herald Sun Tour
1st Stages 2, 3 & 5
 Tour Méditerranéen
1st Stages 1 & 3
 1st Stage 2 Three Days of De Panne
 3rd Overall Tour Down Under
1st Stage 6
2005
 Herald Sun Tour
1st Stages 4 & 5
 1st Stage 1 Tour of Poland
 5th Dwars door Vlaanderen
 6th Gent–Wevelgem
2006
 1st Grand Prix d'Ouverture La Marseillaise
 1st Halle–Ingooigem
 1st Stage 1 Course de la Paix
 1st Stage 5 Tour de Wallonie
 5th Overall Tour of Denmark
 6th Paris–Tours
 10th E3 Prijs Vlaanderen
2007
 1st Kampioenschap van Vlaanderen
 1st Stage 3 Tour Down Under
 1st Stage 2 Étoile de Bessèges
 4th Paris–Brussels
 6th Omloop Het Volk
 8th Gent–Wevelgem
2008
 1st Stage 2 Clásica Internacional de Alcobendas y Villalba
 1st Stage 1 Geelong Bay Classic Series
 1st Stage 3 Herald Sun Tour
2009
 1st Stage 4 Herald Sun Tour
2010
 1st Stage 4 Bay Classic Series
2011
 2nd Paris–Bourges
 5th Dwars door Vlaanderen
 10th Gent–Wevelgem

Grand Tour general classification results timeline

References

External links

 
 Australian Cycling Federation profile

Baden Cooke's profile at Cycling Base

1978 births
Living people
Australian male cyclists
Australian Tour de France stage winners
Tour de Suisse stage winners
Cyclists at the 2004 Summer Olympics
Olympic cyclists of Australia
Cyclists at the 2002 Commonwealth Games
People from Benalla
Cyclists from Victoria (Australia)
Australian Institute of Sport cyclists
Commonwealth Games bronze medallists for Australia
Commonwealth Games medallists in cycling
Australian Survivor contestants
Medallists at the 2002 Commonwealth Games